Maria Dobroniega of Kiev (b. aft. 1012 – d. 13 December 1087), was a Kievan Rus' princess of the Rurikid dynasty and by marriage Duchess of Poland.

Life

Family
She was one of the younger children of Vladimir I, Grand Prince of Kiev. The identity of her mother is disputed among historians and web sources.

Grand Prince Vladimir I had married seven times and had fathered many children, legitimate and illegitimate. Anna Porphyrogeneta, his sixth wife, is known to have predeceased Vladimir by four years. Chronicle Thietmar of Merseburg, writing from contemporary accounts, mentions that Bolesław I of Poland captured Vladimir I's widow during his raid on Kiev in 1018. The historians long had no clue as to identity of this wife. The emigre historian Nicholas Baumgarten, however, pointed to the controversial record of the Genealogia Welforum and the Historia Welforum Weingartensis that one daughter of Count Kuno von Oenningen (future Duke Konrad I of Swabia) by "filia Ottonis Magni imperatoris" (Otto the Great's daughter; possibly Rechlinda Otona [Regelindis], claimed by some as illegitimate daughter and by others legitimate, born from his first marriage with Edith of England) married "rex Rugorum" (King of Rus). He interpreted this evidence as pertaining to Vladimir I's last wife. This woman is a possible identity for Maria's mother.

Marriage
Maria married around 1040 to Casimir I the Restorer, Duke of Poland. This marriage helped Casimir to gain support in his reclaim over the Polish throne. Casimir had attempted to seize the throne twice before, both times he failed. With the support of Maria's brother, Yaroslav I the Wise, Casimir was able to make a successful claim.

The couple had five children:
Bolesław II the Bold (b. c. 1043 – d. 2/3 April 1081/82).
Władysław I Herman (b. c. 1044 – d. 4 June 1102)
Mieszko (b. 16 April 1045 – d. 28 January 1065).
Otto (b. c. 1046 – d. 1048).
Świętosława (b. c. 1048 – d. 1 September 1126), married c. 1062 to Duke (and since 1085 King) Vratislaus II of Bohemia.

Maria's husband died on 28 November 1058. Her sixteen-year-old son, Bolesław, later (1076) became King of Poland. Bolesław II is considered one of the most capable of the Piast rulers. However, he was deposed and expelled from the country in 1079.

Maria survived her oldest son by five or six years, dying in 1087.

References

1010s births
1087 deaths

Year of birth uncertain
Kievan Rus' princesses
11th-century Rus' women
Rurik dynasty
Polish queens consort
11th-century Rus' people
11th-century Polish people
11th-century Polish women
Children of Vladimir the Great